Jargalan may refer to:
 Jargalan Rural District, in Iran
 Jargal (disambiguation)